Qualification for the 1999 FIBA European Championship, commonly called FIBA EuroBasket 1999 took place between 22 May 1996 and 28 February 1999. A total of fourteen teams qualified for the tournament, joining hosts France and World Champions Yugoslavia.

Format
A total of 39 teams participated. Competition consisted of three stages:

A Preliminary Round that consisted of six teams that competed in a round robin tournament that took place in Reykjavík, Iceland between 22 May and 26 May 1996.
A Qualifying Round where the third, fourth and fifth teams from the Preliminary Round joined another thirteen teams. The sixteen teams where divided in four round robin groups of four teams each and each group competition took place in a different city. This stage was hosted by Cyprus, Ireland, Romania and Slovakia and took place between 23 May and 25 May 1997.
A Semi-Final Round where the first and second teams from the Preliminary Round and from each of the four groups from the Qualifying Round joined another twenty teams. All thirty teams where then divided in five round robin groups of six teams each. This stage took place between 26 November 1997 and 27 February 1999 and competition consisted of home and away legs, taking place in each of the participating countries. The top two teams from each group plus the best four third-placed teams qualified for EuroBasket 1999.

Preliminary round

Times given below are in Western European Time (UTC±00:00).

|}

Qualifying round

Group A (Nicosia, Cyprus)

|}

Group B (Dublin, Ireland)
Times given below are in Western European Summer Time (UTC+01:00).

|}

Group C (Pezinok, Slovakia)
Times given below are in Central European Summer Time (UTC+02:00).

|}

Group D (Dej, Romania)
Times given below are in Eastern European Summer Time (UTC+03:00).

|}

Semi-final round

Group A

|}

Group B

|}

Group C

|}

Group D

|}

Group E

|}

References

External links

qualification
1996–97 in European basketball
1997–98 in European basketball
1998–99 in European basketball
1999